Hibbertia covenyana is a species of flowering plant in the family Dilleniaceae and is endemic to New South Wales. It is an erect or semi-prostrate shrub with hairy foliage, oblong leaves and yellow flowers with seven to ten stamens arranged on one side of the two carpels.

Description
Flowering occurs from September to November.<ref name="RBGS">{{cite web |title=Hibbertia covenyana|url= https://plantnet.rbgsyd.nsw.gov.au/cgi-bin/NSWfl.pl?page=nswfl&lvl=sp&name=Hibbertia~covenyana |publisher=Royal Botanic Garden Sydney |access-date=3 May 2021}}</ref>

TaxonomyHibbertia covenyana was first formally described in 1990 by Barry Conn in the journal Muelleria from specimens collected near the road between Narrabri and Coonabarabran in 1976. The specific epithet (covenyana'') honours Robert Coveny who collected the type specimens.

Distribution and habitat
This hibbertia grows scattered locations in open forest, mainly in the Pilliga Scrub in central northern New South Wales.

See also
List of Hibbertia species

References

covenyana
Flora of New South Wales
Plants described in 1990
Taxa named by Barry John Conn